Opisthostoma hosei is a species of air-breathing land snail with an operculum, a terrestrial gastropod mollusk in the family Diplommatinidae.

Distribution 
This species occurs in Borneo.

References

Diplommatinidae